The Stearman C3 was an American-built civil biplane aircraft of the 1920s, designed by Stearman Aircraft of Wichita, Kansas.  It was also the first Stearman aircraft to receive a type certificate.

Development
The C3 was a rugged biplane with simple straight wings, a tough undercarriage with oleo shock absorbers and two open cockpits with the pilot in the rear and two side-by-side passenger seats in the front. In fact, it was a slightly modified version of the earlier model C2 aircraft. Changes included an increased volume oil tank and larger sized baggage compartment.

Introduced in 1928, the C3 was powered by a variety of engines of between 128 hp and 225 hp, each version having its own designation. The last version of the C3 was the C3R which had several external differences including a cutout in the aft portion of the wing center section for improved pilot visibility, a headrest in the aft cockpit, and slightly increased chord of the rudder and vertical stabilizer.

Although there were several versions of the C3, most were either the C3B and the C3R. A few C3s were approved for float operations.

Operational history
The C3 was built with light commercial applications in mind, including passenger flying and business flights. The C3MB was a special mail-carrying aircraft based on the C3 with the forward cockpit enclosed as a dedicated cargo compartment. This version was operated in 1928 by National Parks Airways on airmail route CAM 26 from Salt Lake City, Utah to Pocatello, Idaho and Great Falls, Montana.

Variants
Data from:Airlife's World Aircraft, Aerofiles:Stearman
Variants produced were:
C1
First of the C series powered by a Curtiss OX-5, later re-engined with a  Menasco-Salmson radial as the C1X. One built.
C2
Four aircraft similar to the C1, with the radiator mounted underneath, hydraulic shock absorbers and dual controls. Variously powered by  Curtiss OX-5, Wright-Hisso A, Wright Whirlwind and Menasco-Salmson radial engine.

C3B Sport Commercial
 Wright J5 radial engine.
C3C
 Wright Martin/Hispano Suiza E engine.
C3D 
 Wright Martin/Hispano Suiza E engine. 1 delivered.
C3E
 Wright Martin/Hispano Suiza E2 engine
C3F
 Wright Martin/Hispano Suiza E3 engine.
C3G
 Wright Martin/Hispano Suiza E4 engine.
C3H
 Menasco-Salmson air-cooled engine.
C3I
 Curtiss C6 engine.
C3K
 Siemens-Halske Sh 12.
C3L
 Comet 7D radial engine. 1 built, later converted to C3B.
C3MB
C3B with forward cockpit enclosed for mail carrying.
C3P
 Wright J5 Whirlwind radial engine.
C3R Business Speedster
 Wright J6.

Operators

Peruvian Air Force

Aircraft on display

Museum of Flight, Seattle, Washington
Western Antique Aeroplane & Automobile Museum has a 1928 model Stearman C3B NC8830

Specifications (C3B)

See also

Aircraft of comparable role, configuration and era 
Alexander Eaglerock
American Eagle A-101
Brunner-Winkle Bird
Buhl-Verville CA-3 Airster
Command-Aire 3C3
Parks P-1
Pitcairn Mailwing
Spartan C3
Swallow New Swallow
Travel Air 2000 and 4000
Waco 10

Related lists 

 List of aircraft
 List of civil aircraft

References

Notes

Bibliography

 Davies, R.E.G. Airlines of the United States since 1914. Washington, DC: Smithsonian Institution Press, 1998. .
 Simpson, Rod. Airlife's World Aircraft. Shrewsbury, UK: Airlife Publishing Ltd, 2001. .

External links

 The Stearman C-3 by Peter M. Bowers

1920s United States mailplanes
1920s United States civil aircraft
C3
Biplanes
Single-engined tractor aircraft
Aircraft first flown in 1927